Alessandro Terrin (born 11 July 1985) is a male Italian swimmer. He represented Italy at the 2008 Olympic Games in the 100m breaststroke and the 4×100m; medley relay swimming events.

His favourite event is the 50m breaststroke: he won several medals in this event and became European champion at the 2006 European LC Championships in Budapest together with Oleg Lisogor; he also won a silver medal at the 2006 SC World Championships in Shanghai.

At the 2008 European SC Championships in Rijeka he won a gold medal in the 4×50 m medley relay event, where the Italian team set the current European record and world's best performance.

Personal bests

He currently holds 1 world's best performance (WB), 1 European record (ER) and 1 Italian records (IR). His personal bests (as of the 27 May 2009) are:

References

1985 births
Living people
Italian male breaststroke swimmers
Olympic swimmers of Italy
Swimmers at the 2008 Summer Olympics
Medalists at the FINA World Swimming Championships (25 m)
European Aquatics Championships medalists in swimming
Mediterranean Games gold medalists for Italy
Mediterranean Games bronze medalists for Italy
Mediterranean Games medalists in swimming
Swimmers at the 2005 Mediterranean Games
Sportspeople from the Metropolitan City of Venice
People from Dolo
20th-century Italian people
21st-century Italian people